Jean Taittinger (25 January 1923 – 23 September 2012) was a French politician and member of the champagne producing Taittinger family.

Political career
Taittinger was Minister of Budget between 7 January 1971 and 5 April 1973. He also was Minister of Justice between 5 April 1973 and 28 May 1974.

Taittinger held the position of Mayor of Reims for 18 years, leaving the position in 1977.

Taittinger family business
He was the son of politician and businessman Pierre Taittinger.

References

External links
 Taittinger family website

1923 births
2012 deaths
Politicians from Paris
Union for the New Republic politicians
Union of Democrats for the Republic politicians
French Ministers of Budget
French Ministers of Justice
Collège Stanislas de Paris alumni
Deputies of the 1st National Assembly of the French Fifth Republic
Deputies of the 2nd National Assembly of the French Fifth Republic
Deputies of the 3rd National Assembly of the French Fifth Republic
Deputies of the 4th National Assembly of the French Fifth Republic
Deputies of the 5th National Assembly of the French Fifth Republic
Mayors of places in Grand Est
French military personnel of World War II